Two Can Play That Game is a 2001 American romantic comedy film written and directed by Mark Brown and starring Vivica A. Fox and Morris Chestnut.

Plot

Shante Smith (Vivica A. Fox) is a woman who gives advice on how to keep a man in check. Her ideals are challenged when her man, an attorney, named Keith Fenton (Morris Chestnut), threatens to stray. Smith is a well-educated woman who feels that when it comes to men and their tricks, she knows them all.

On the other end, Shante’s boyfriend Keith is being led by his friend Tony (Anthony Anderson), who thinks he knows all the tricks that women play. When Shanté's boyfriend, Keith, is caught red-handed stepping out with a co worker, Shanté institutes her "Ten Day Plan" to get her man in line. The battle soon begins, though at the conclusion of the movie, Shante and Keith get back together.

Cast
Vivica A. Fox as Shante Smith
Morris Chestnut as Keith Fenton
Anthony Anderson as Tony
Gabrielle Union as Connie "Conny" Spalding
Wendy Raquel Robinson as Karen
Tamala Jones as Tracey Johnson
Bobby Brown as Michael
Mo'Nique as Diedre
Ray Wise as Bill Parker
Jeff Markey as Phil
Dondre T. Whitfield as Dwain
Lee Anthony as Attorney in Elevator
Cherise Bangs as Miller Girl #2
Zatella Beatty as Cynthia
Mark Brown as Lying Man #1
Chris Spencer as Lying Man #2
Pierre Burgess as Lying Man #3
Mark Christopher Lawrence as Lying Man #4
Natashia Williams as Sexy Woman in Club
La La Anthony as Party DJ
Colby Kane as Calvin
Terrence "Skyy" Grant as Choir Member
Pretty Boy Duncan as Town Skank
Amy Hunter as Nita

Box office
The film opened at #2 at the box office in the United States, raking in $7,720,942 USD in its first opening weekend, behind The Musketeer. The film was released in the United Kingdom on September 13, 2002, and failed to reach the Top 10.

Critical reception

Sequel
A direct to DVD film, titled Three Can Play That Game, was released in February 2008. The sequel was rated, although there was still a little inappropriate content. Three Can Play That Game starred Vivica A. Fox as Shante Smith, a famous couple's counsellor. This time around, Fox's character plays a supporting role, as opposed to her starring role in the original. Morris Chestnut or his character doesn't make an appearance, but he was mentioned.

Stage play adaptation 
Stage producer and playwright Je'Caryous Johnson adapted a stage play based on the film of same name in 2017. Vivica A. Fox starred and reprised her role as Shante Smith. The production also starred Columbus Short as Keith, Porsha Williams as Conny, Carl Payne as Tony, and also featured Gary Dourdan, RonReaco Lee, Cocoa Brown and Vivian Green.

References

External links
 
 
 
 

2001 romantic comedy-drama films
African-American romantic comedy-drama films
2000s English-language films
Screen Gems films
2001 directorial debut films
2001 comedy films
2001 films
2001 drama films
2000s American films